Donald Ross Eagle (born 28 July 1936) is a New Zealand former cyclist. He competed in the team pursuit event at the 1956 Summer Olympics.

References

External links
 

1936 births
Living people
New Zealand male cyclists
Olympic cyclists of New Zealand
Cyclists at the 1956 Summer Olympics
Cyclists from Auckland
20th-century New Zealand people